Elizabeth Jane Zemiro (born 4 October 1939) is an Australian academic and author. She was awarded the Ordre des Palmes Académiques by the French Government in 2000. Zemiro is the mother of actor and television presenter Julia Zemiro.

Biography
Zemiro was born in Miles, Queensland in 1939 and she grew up in Maryborough. She studied at the University of Queensland and was awarded a Bachelor of Arts degree.

In the mid-1960s, Zemiro travelled to France by ship. On board, she met French-Algerian waiter Claude Zemiro, whom she subsequently married. In France, Zemiro studied at the University of Aix-en-Provence where she gained a Licence ès lettres. In 1967, Jane and Claude had a daughter, Julia.

After returning from France, the family lived in Zemiro's home town of Maryborough before settling in Sydney in 1970. Jane taught French in high schools and Claude opened two restaurants, Home Cooking and Crab Apple. Zemiro was subsequently appointed  Senior Lecturer in Teaching Studies LOTE at the University of Sydney, where she also obtained a Master of Arts degree.

Zemiro co-wrote the book series Tapis Volant and Mini Vol, and Révisions. She also translated poems in the online magazine Ekleksographia: wave two. In 2012, Jane Zemiro co-wrote an article on translating poetry, "An Act of Rash Bravado".

Zemiro is the partner of poet Pam Brown.

Awards and honours
In 2000, Zemiro was awarded the Ordre des Palmes Académiques by the French Government.

References

1939 births
Living people
Australian writers
Australian women writers
Academic staff of the University of Sydney
Chevaliers of the Ordre des Palmes Académiques